The Athena School is an independent, co-educational school for Preschool to Year 10 students located in Newtown, an inner western suburb of Sydney, New South Wales, Australia. The teaching approaches of the school are based on the works of L. Ron Hubbard. The school is registered by the Board of Studies, Teaching and Educational Standards and is a member of the NSW Association of Independent Schools.

The school uses Study Tech.

Athena School and The Church of Scientology 

The school is affiliated with the Church of Scientology with teachings based on L. Ron Hubbard's philosophy of education, centered on overcoming the fundamental barriers that prevent one from fully comprehending one's studies. Per their website, the school states, "The Athena School is licensed under Applied Scholastics International to use the educational philosophy of author and humanitarian L. Ron Hubbard. As he is also the founder of Scientology, there can be some assumption that The Athena School is a religious school when we are not. The Athena School does not promote any one religion. Our students learn tolerance and respect in accordance with Article 18 of the Universal Declaration of Human Rights."

Since 2007, all teachers are registered with the Board of Studies, Teaching and Educational Standards.

The Athena School follows the guidelines set out by the NSW Board of Studies in its curriculum.

In March 2010 the Greens New South Wales party lodged an official complaint about the school to the Australian Competition & Consumer Commission due to an advertising leaflet which fails to reveal the school's link to Scientology. The Principal of the school said the Applied Scholastics study method did not teach the Scientology religion, "We follow the Board of Studies curriculum. We use the study method of L. Ron Hubbard. It is a method of study, it is not teaching Scientology."

Green School program with Street Coolers 

In 2015 the school started a "green school" program with Street Coolers, a community-focused organisation with a mission to cool our urban areas. This involved the school utilising several machines capable of creating several kilograms of compost per day, a reverse-vending machine open to the public, which allows individuals to recycle plastic bottles and aluminium cans for coupons, as well as energy and weather monitoring to assess power usage and how the weather affects this.

See also 
Scientology in Australia
 List of non-government schools in New South Wales

References

Further reading

External links
 Athena School website

Private secondary schools in Sydney
Private primary schools in Sydney
School buildings completed in 1987
Educational institutions established in 1987
Scientology-related schools
1987 establishments in Australia
Newtown, New South Wales